Travancoria is a small genus of hillstream loaches endemic to India.

Species
There are currently two recognized species in this genus:
 Travancoria elongata Pethiyagoda & Kottelat, 1994
 Travancoria jonesi Hora, 1941 (Travancore loach)

References

Balitoridae
Fish of Asia
Fish of India